V&S Group (V&S Vin & Sprit AB), founded in 1917, is an international producer and distributor of alcoholic beverages. The group is currently owned by Pernod Ricard. Headquartered in Stockholm, the capital of Sweden, the group employs approximately 2,500 people.

Until 1994, the group had the position of a national alcohol monopoly for production and distribution, but this was abolished when Sweden joined the European Union in 1995. However, the Swedish alcohol retailing monopoly, operated by Systembolaget, is still in force. On March 31, 2008 it was announced that the Swedish government intended to sell V & S Group to Pernod Ricard for 5.626 billion euro, corresponding to 55 billion Swedish kronor. The deal was approved and finalized on July 24, 2008 at an estimated value of 5.69 billion euro.

The acronym V&S comes from the name Vin & Sprit, literally meaning "Wine & Liquor."

Organization and brands
V&S Group is divided into three main areas:

V&S Absolute Spirits handles Absolut Vodka and the other international spirits brands, such as Level Vodka, Frïs Vodka.
V&S Distillers handles spirits on the Northern and Central European markets.
V&S Wine handles wines and fortified wines in the Nordic region.

Production and distribution
The production of the group's international spirits takes place in Sweden, Denmark, Great Britain, and St. Croix, U.S. Virgin Islands. Production of their local and regional spirits takes place primarily in Sweden, Denmark, Finland, Germany, and Poland. In Northern Europe, V&S Group is the largest importer and distributor of wine. The group offers their own brands of wine and also produces brands by well-known international companies.

Distribution in the Nordic area is primarily handled through the group's distribution centers in Sweden, Denmark, and Finland. V&S Group is represented by the subsidiary V&S Norway in Norway, by V&S Eesti in Estonia, and by the company V&S Luksusowa Zielona Góra in Poland. In the United States, distribution was handled by Future Brands, LLC, a joint-venture with Fortune Brands. In most other regions of the world, distribution was handled by Maxxium, which was also partly owned by the group.

Sales
About three-quarters of the group's sales come from spirits, whereas the remaining quarter comes from wine. Vodka is their largest selling spirit, in which Absolut holds the highest sales figures. Geographically, North America is the group's single biggest market, accounting for 43% of total sales in 2007. The Swedish market accounts for one-sixth (approximately 15%) of sales. As volume is concerned, the group sold 158.4 million liters of spirits and 83.7 million liters of wine, totaling 242.1 million liters of product.

See also
List of government enterprises of Sweden

Notes

External links
V&S Group (in English) > 6.Aug. 2019: Seems not to work anymore 
V&S Group (in Swedish) > 6.Aug. 2019: Seems not to work anymore
 Updated link. Owned by Pernod-Richard

Government-owned companies of Sweden
Food and drink companies based in Stockholm
Manufacturing companies based in Stockholm
Pernod Ricard brands
2008 mergers and acquisitions